Televicentro or TVC is a television corporation in Honduras, which as of 2004, is owned by Rafael Ferrari</u>.

Televicentro was founded in 1987 with the aim of merging Canal 5, Canal 3/7 and Telecadena 7/4 under an umbrella organization, aiming at improving the coverage of the stations and creating relayers for them.

References

External links
Official site

Television in Honduras
Spanish-language television stations